Brunsdon Lock is a lock on the Kennet and Avon Canal, near Kintbury, Berkshire, England.

The lock has a rise/fall of 4 ft 11 in (1.5 m).
The Lock is also known as Brunsden Lock and was the site of a coal and grain merchant's business:Brunsdens for many years.

It is a grade II listed building.

References

See also

Locks on the Kennet and Avon Canal

Grade II listed buildings in Berkshire
Locks on the Kennet and Avon Canal
Locks of Berkshire
Grade II listed canals
Kintbury